Fantasm Comes Again is a 1977 Australian softcore pornographic film. It is the sequel to Fantasm (1976) and was the first feature directed by Colin Eggleston.

Plot
Journalist Libbie is taking over the "Dear Collette" sex advice column at her newspaper from veteran reporter Harry, who is retiring. Over the course of one night, Harry talks Libbie through a series of letters from their readers. They include:
rape in a drive in theatre
teacher-student sex in a gym
lesbian seduction in a barn
a suburban orgy
incest
sex in a pool
sex in a library
oral sex on the road
a threesome in an elevator
sex between monks and a nun.

Cast

Angela Menzies-Wills as Libbie
Clive Hearne as Harry
Silence Please
Tom Thumb as Harold
Liz Wolfe as Rita
Rosemarie Bern as Cindy
Christine De Shaffer as First Reader
Pat Benco (Pat Manning) as Second Reader
Martin Margulies as Third Reader
Workout
Rick Cassidy as Mr Bates
Michael Barton as Miss Peabody
Double Feature
Urias S. Cambridge as Bob
Rainbeaux Smith as Carol
Peter Kurzon as Ted
Lois Owens as Alice
Mike Stapp as Rapist

Going Up?
Suzy A. Star as Penny
Amanda Smith as Sally
Herb Layne as Bill
Rhonda Willcox as First Onlooker
Eve Darling as Second Onlooker
Sam Menning as Third Onlooker
Straw Dolls
Uschi Digard as Leslie
Dee Dee Levitt as Bianca
Dee Cooper as Jake
The Good Old Gang at the Office
Con Covert as Mr. Clark
Lem Lary as Mr. Davis
Brenda Fogarty as Miss Christie
Bryant Rigby as Tony
Elaine Collins as Miss Ford
Helen O'Connell as Miss Carter
Pat Benco (Pat Manning) as First Guest
Titus Moede as Second Guest
P.J. Jackson as Lollipop
Winston as El Che
Candy Fox as Yellow Rose

The Kiss of Life
Bill Margold as Tony
Suzanne Walsh as Samantha
Linda York as Jo
Mary Johnson as Terri
John C. Holmes as Stud
Titus Moede as Moody
Family Reunion
Al Ward as Uncle Fred
Mary Gavin (Candy Samples) as Frances
Nancy Mann as Virginia
Kodax as Fluffy
Overdrive
Jesse Adams as Sterling
Christine De Shaffer as Carol
True Confession
Serena as Imogene
Michael Karnitz as Joe
Antony I. Ginnane as Monk

Production
The linking scenes between the two journalists were shot in Australia, and the sex scenes were filmed over 12 days in Los Angeles by an Australian director and cinematographer, using American porn stars.

The budget was larger on the sequel in an attempt to attract a bigger audience; in contrast with the original, where only one of the ten stories was lip sync and the rest in voice over, all the stories in Fantasm Comes Again had lip sync dialogue. Ginnane later thought this was a mistake as it distracted from what was on screen.

Reception
The film sold well around the world but was not as popular as Fantasm at the Australian box office. Ginnane blamed the fact by the time it was released there was a glut of sex films on the market and the delay caused by censorship hold ups. (In 1980 David Stratton called it "the most censored of the new Australian films.") By 1979 the film had not yet broken even but Ginnane was confident that would be the case.

Ginnane later said that he felt Colin Eggleston was just as competent a director as Richard Franklin but thought his sense of humour was different "and perhaps it didn't suit the material as well".

References

External links

Fantasm Comes Again at Oz Movies

1977 films
Australian pornographic films
1970s English-language films
1970s pornographic films
Films directed by Colin Eggleston
Films shot in Australia
Films shot in Los Angeles